The Sixth Battle of the Isonzo, better known as the Battle of Gorizia, was the most successful Italian offensive along the Soča (Isonzo) River during World War I.

Background 
Franz Conrad von Hötzendorf had reduced the Austro-Hungarian forces along the Soča (Isonzo) front to reinforce his Trentino Offensive and also to assist with the defense of the Russian Brusilov Offensive then taking place on the eastern front.  Italian Chief-of-Staff Luigi Cadorna turned his attention (along with that of Prince Emanuele Filiberto, Duke of Aosta – Commander of the Italian Third Army) to the Isonzo front and particularly, the city of Gorizia. They planned a heavy bombardment in a very restricted zone between Monte Calvario and Monte San Michele – two heights overlooking the city. The bombardment would be followed by ground action to obtain control of the left bank of the Isonzo.  Moreover, this battle would start with an advantage because the Italians had already succeeded in advancing towards the top of Monte Sabotino another height (which overlooks the Isonzo valley and is key to the control of the city) above Gorizia and Italian sappers had built several tunnels behind the emplacements of the Austro-Hungarian troops there.

Cadorna also made good use of railroads to quickly shift troops from Trentino back to the Isonzo line for this offensive against the weakened Austro-Hungarian defenses.

Battle 
On 6 August the offensive was launched against Gorizia. The offensive was concentrated in two zones: the hilly area west of the Soča (Isonzo) river near Gorizia and the westernmost edge of the Karst Plateau near Doberdò del Lago. In the Battle of Doberdò, the Italians, after bloody hand-to-hand combat, managed to conquer the main transport road leading from the coast town of Duino to Gorizia, thus securing their advance to Gorizia from the south. The Austro-Hungarian forces had to retreat on the line east of Gorizia (Mount Škabrijel), leaving the heavily damaged town to the Italians.

The bombardment at Gorizia was extremely heavy and effective. Borojevic asked for reinforcements but was denied. In the afternoon Cadorna ordered the 45th division to attack Monte Sabotino. In under one hour, supported by heavy artillery, the Italian infantry reached the peak.

Simultaneously the attack on Monte San Michele also commenced. The Italian Infantry succeeded quickly to reach the summit while the Austro-Hungarian soldiers retreated waiting for a later counterattack. In the absence of reserve forces (which had been deployed to Mount Sabotino), that counter failed.

With the conquest of Monte Sabotino and Monte San Michele, the previously strong Austro-Hungarian defensive line around Gorizia rapidly disintegrated. Then Monte Calvario fell during that night. On the right bank of the Isonzo there was only one regiment who then withdrew to the east on 8 August.  The first platoons of the Pavia Brigade began to enter the city. Gorizia fell to Cadorna and a bridgehead was finally established across the Soča (Isonzo) River. The Austro-Hungarians shifted troops to the Gorizia sector to prevent a breakthrough.

Borojevic, had already ordered his men to retreat further to the east, into a valley called The Vallone.  Thus strategic positions on the western Carso such as Monte Sei Busi, the zone around Doberdò del Lago and Monte Cosich to the north of Monfalcone (which the Vallone separated from the eastern Carso) were thus abandoned.

However, the Austro-Hungarian defenses in the north and east of Gorizia still included an uninterrupted series of heights – including ridges from Monte Santo, Monte San Gabriele, Monte San Daniele. These heights and Quota 383 lent themselves to place the Austro - Hungarian artillery and provide excellent observatories after the fall of Gorizia.  These heights had been prepared for defense purposes and  made it possible to block any passage towards by the Italian troops to Vienna and Trieste.

The new Austro-Hungarian front line now passed to Nad Logem (Quota 212), Quota 187 (near Devetachi), Opacchiasella, Nova Vas and Quota 208 north and south, Quota 144 and Quota 77 and the Austro-Hungarian troops engaged the Italians in a series of heavy, defensive firefights.

Content with having established the bridgehead, capturing Gorizia and the western Karst, and having suffered heavy losses, Cadorna ended the offensive on 17 August.

The attack on Gorizia was the most successful Italian offensive along the Isonzo lines and greatly boosted Italian morale - especially since Gorizia had been promoted as a desirable objective, unattainable in earlier battles. In the wake of the battle Italy finally declared war against Germany, on 28 August.

.

See also
First Battle of the Isonzo - 23 June–7 July 1915
Second Battle of the Isonzo - 18 July–3 August 1915
Third Battle of the Isonzo - 18 October–3 November 1915
Fourth Battle of the Isonzo - 10 November–2 December 1915
Fifth Battle of the Isonzo - 9–17 March 1916
Seventh Battle of the Isonzo - 14–17 September 1916
Eighth Battle of the Isonzo - 10–12 October 1916
Ninth Battle of the Isonzo - 1–4 November 1916
Tenth Battle of the Isonzo - 12 May–8 June 1917
Eleventh Battle of the Isonzo - 19 August–12 September 1917
Twelfth Battle of the Isonzo - 24 October–7 November 1917 also known as the Battle of Caporetto

References
Tucker, Spencer The Great War:1914-18 (1998)

Footnotes

Further reading

External links
Sixth Battle of the Isonzo
FirstWorldWar.Com: The Battles of the Isonzo, 1915-17
Battlefield Maps: Italian Front
11 Battles at the Isonzo
The Walks of Peace in the Soča Region Foundation. The Foundation preserves, restores and presents the historical and cultural heritage of the First World War in the area of the Isonzo Front for the study, tourist and educational purposes.
The Kobarid Museum (in English) 
Društvo Soška Fronta (in Slovenian)
Pro Hereditate - extensive site (in En/It/Sl)

Isonzo 06
Isonzo 06
Isonzo 06
Isonzo 06
the Isonzo
1916 in Italy
1916 in Austria-Hungary
August 1916 events